Alyssa Jean Anderson (born September 30, 1990) is an American competition swimmer and Olympic gold medalist who represented the United States as the 2012 Summer Olympics.

Personal

Anderson was born in Santa Clara, California but grew up in Granite Bay. She attended the University of Arizona, where she swam for coach Frank Busch's Arizona Wildcats women's swim team in National Collegiate Athletic Association (NCAA) competition from 2008 to 2012.  Anderson's younger sister, Haley, is also a swimmer and competed with her at the 2009 World Aquatics Championships.

Career

At the 2007 Junior Pan Pacific Championships, Anderson won silver medals in the 800-meter and 1,500-meter freestyle.

At the 2009 U.S. Nationals and World Championship Trials, Anderson placed fourth in the 200-meter freestyle, earning a place on the U.S. 4x200-meter freestyle relay team at the 2009 World Aquatics Championships in Rome.  In Rome, Anderson swam the third leg of the relay preliminaries and split 1:58.35.  The U.S. team advanced to the final and won the silver medal.

At the 2012 United States Olympic Trials in Omaha, Nebraska, the U.S. qualifying meet for the Olympics, Anderson made the U.S. Olympic team for the first time by finishing sixth in the 200-meter freestyle with a time of 1:58.40, which qualified her to swim in the 4x200-meter freestyle as a member of the U.S. relay team.  At the 2012 Summer Olympics in London, she swam for the winning U.S. team in the preliminary heats of the women's 4x200-meter freestyle relay and earned a gold medal.  Anderson's sister, Haley, won a silver medal in the 10-kilometer open water marathon at the 2012 Olympics.

Personal bests (long course)

See also

 Arizona Wildcats
 List of Olympic medalists in swimming (women)
 List of University of Arizona people
 List of World Aquatics Championships medalists in swimming (women)

References

External links
 
 
 
 
 
 

1990 births
Living people
American female butterfly swimmers
American female freestyle swimmers
Arizona Wildcats women's swimmers
Medalists at the 2012 Summer Olympics
Olympic gold medalists for the United States in swimming
Sportspeople from Santa Clara, California
Sportspeople from Greater Sacramento
Swimmers from California
Swimmers at the 2012 Summer Olympics
World Aquatics Championships medalists in swimming
People from Granite Bay, California
Universiade medalists in swimming
Universiade gold medalists for the United States
Medalists at the 2011 Summer Universiade
20th-century American women
21st-century American women